Københavns Idrætspark, in daily use Idrætsparken, also known as Parken, was a multi-purpose stadium in Copenhagen, Denmark. It was initially used as the stadium of Denmark national football team and Kjøbenhavns Boldklub. It was replaced by the Parken Stadium in 1992. The capacity of the stadium was 48,000 spectators.

The main stadium, the first fully enclosed ground in Denmark, opened on the 25 May 1911, with a capacity of 12000, with a football match between a Copenhagen XI and The Wednesday of England.

By the end of the 1920s, the Idrætsparken boasted the main stadium, a separate athletics track (1912), indoor sports hall (1914), hockey pitch, and an indoor swimming pool (1929).

The main stand, which was retained in the new Parken Stadium, was inaugurated on 2 October 1955, England defeating Denmark 5-1.

From 1911 to 1990, the Danish national team played 232 games at Idrætsparken, winning 125 games and losing 66.

References

External links
 Stadium information

Defunct football venues in Denmark
Athletics (track and field) venues in Denmark
Denmark national football team
Multi-purpose stadiums in Denmark
Sports venues in Copenhagen
Sports venues completed in 1911
1911 establishments in Denmark
1990 disestablishments in Denmark
Kjøbenhavns Boldklub